Béla Juhász (20 April 1921 in Nagykáta – June 2002 in Budapest) was a Hungarian long-distance runner who competed in the 1952 Summer Olympics.

References

1921 births
2002 deaths
Hungarian male long-distance runners
Olympic athletes of Hungary
Athletes (track and field) at the 1952 Summer Olympics
Athletes from Budapest
People from Nagykáta
20th-century Hungarian people
21st-century Hungarian people